The Turkmen State Institute of Architecture and Construction (formerly called Turkmen Polytechnic Institute) is a major university in Turkmenistan. It is the leading educational institution in Turkmenistan for engineering and energy. A number of noted Turkmen politicians studied at the university, particularly in the economic sector, including Annaguly Deryayev, Hojamyrat Geldimyradov, Yagshygeldi Kakayev, Hydyr Saparlyyev and Täçberdi Tagyýew.

See also
 List of universities in Turkmenistan

External links
 Official website

Universities in Turkmenistan
Buildings and structures in Ashgabat
Educational institutions established in 1963
1963 establishments in the Soviet Union